The Witch (stylized as The VVitch, and subtitled A New-England Folktale) is a 2015 folk horror film written and directed by Robert Eggers in his feature directorial debut. It stars Anya Taylor-Joy in her first film appearance, along with Ralph Ineson, Kate Dickie, Harvey Scrimshaw, Ellie Grainger, and Lucas Dawson. Set in 1630s New England, it follows a Puritan family who encounter forces of evil in the woods beyond their farm.

An international co-production of the United States and Canada, the film premiered at the Sundance Film Festival on January 27, 2015, and was widely released by A24 on February 19, 2016. It was a critical and financial success, grossing $40 million against a $4 million budget, and is considered by some to be one of the best horror films of 2016.

Plot
In 1630s New England, English settler William and his family—wife Katherine, teenage daughter Thomasin, pubescent son Caleb, and young fraternal twins Mercy and Jonas—are banished from a Puritan settlement over a religious dispute. The family builds a farm near a large, secluded forest and Katherine bears her fifth child, Samuel. One day, when Thomasin is playing peekaboo with Samuel near the edge of the wood, the baby abruptly disappears. It is soon revealed that a witch has stolen and killed the unbaptized Samuel to use his body to make a flying ointment.

Katherine, devastated by Samuel's abduction, spends her days crying and praying. As a blight has afflicted the family's crops, William decides to try to get enough food to last through the upcoming winter by hunting wild animals, and he takes Caleb to the woods, where he discloses that he secretly traded Katherine's prized silver cup for hunting supplies. When they get home, the twins have riled-up the family's billy goat, Black Phillip, and William quickly puts Black Phillip back in his pen. Katherine chastises William and Caleb for disappearing and Thomasin for not watching the twins well enough. Thomasin is sent to wash William's clothes at the brook, and, when Mercy bothers her, she teases the girl by saying she is a witch and gave Samuel to the Devil. At dinner, Katherine questions Thomasin about the disappearance of the cup, and William remains silent. That night, the children overhear their parents make plans to send Thomasin away to serve another family.

Early the next morning, Thomasin finds Caleb in the stable preparing to check a trap in the forest, and forces him to take her with him by threatening to awaken their parents. In the woods, they spot a hare, which sends their horse into a panic. Their dog Fowler chases the hare, and Caleb pursues Fowler. The horse throws Thomasin, knocking her unconscious, and runs away. Caleb becomes lost and discovers Fowler's disemboweled body. He then stumbles upon a hovel from which the witch, disguised as a beautiful woman dressed in a red cape, emerges and kisses him.

William finds Thomasin and takes her home, and Katherine scolds her for taking Caleb into the woods. To defend his daughter, William finally admits he sold the cup. Later that night, as a storm rages, Thomasin finds Caleb outside the cabin, naked, delirious, and mysteriously ill. The next day, the twins tell Thomasin that Black Phillip told them she made Caleb sick, and, when Thomasin attempts to milk the nanny goat, blood comes out of the udder. Caleb awakens and begins to convulse and scream and rant feverishly. After he vomits up a whole rotting apple, the twins accuse Thomasin of witchcraft and claim to forget the Lord's Prayer before falling into convulsions themselves. Katherine, William, and Thomasin say the prayer over Caleb, which calms him for a moment, but then he amorously proclaims his love for Christ and dies.

Believing Thomasin to be a witch, William tells her that Christ can undo her bargain with the Devil if she admits the truth. Thomasin calls him hypocritical and weak, and accuses the twins, aided by and under the influence of Black Philip, who she says is Lucifer, of bewitching the farm. Enraged and confused about the identity of the culprit, William seals his living children in the goat house and says the family will return to the settlement in the morning. Thomasin denies being a witch, but the twins do not answer when she asks if they truly speak with Black Phillip.

Katherine and William bury Caleb, and that night Thomasin observes William break down and ask Christ to punish him for his pride and cowardice, but save his children, and then eat dirt to show his contrition. Later, the witch sneaks into the goat house and drinks blood from the nanny goat before turning to attack the twins, while, in the cabin, Katherine has a hallucinatory vision in which Caleb and Samuel have returned. Caleb says Katherine can see them often and asks if she will look at a book. She tells him to wait while she feeds Samuel, but the baby is actually a raven that pecks at her breast, leaving her bloody in the morning.

William awakens in the morning to find the goat house destroyed, the goats eviscerated, the twins missing, and an unconscious Thomasin lying nearby. As she stirs, Black Phillip gores and kills William. An unhinged Katherine attacks Thomasin and now accuses her of seducing William and Caleb, in addition to causing the tragedies that have befallen the family. In self-defense, Thomasin tearfully kills her mother with a billhook.

Now alone, Thomasin falls asleep at the table in the cabin until after dark. She is awakened by a chiming sound coming from the goat house. She follows Black Phillip inside and urges him to speak to her. The goat responds in a human voice, asking if she would like to live a life of luxury, and materializes into a handsome, black-clad man. He tells Thomasin to remove her clothes and sign her name in a book that appears before her. Thomasin, accompanied by Black Phillip as a goat, then enters the forest nude, where she finds a coven holding a Witches' Sabbath around a bonfire. The witches begin to levitate, and Thomasin joins them, laughing maniacally as she ascends above the trees.

Cast

Production

Development
Eggers, who lived in New Hampshire, was inspired to write the film by his childhood fascination with witches and frequent visits to the Plimoth Plantation as a schoolboy. After unsuccessfully pitching films that were "too weird, too obscure", Eggers realized that he would have to make a more conventional film. He said at a Q&A, "If I'm going to make a genre film, it has to be personal and it has to be good." Director Alfonso Cuarón read the screenplay in 2013, saying it made him "more than anything, curious." The production team worked extensively with British and American museums, as well as consulting experts on 17th-century British agriculture. Eggers wanted the set constructed to be as historically accurate as possible, and therefore brought in a thatcher and a carpenter from Virginia and Massachusetts, respectively, who had the proper experience building in the style of the film's period.

Although Eggers wanted to film the picture on location in New England, the lack of tax incentives meant he had to settle for Canada. This proved to be something of a problem for him, because he could not find the forest environment he was looking for in the country. He eventually began scouting "off the map" and found a suitable location (Kiosk, Ontario) that was "extremely remote"; he said that the nearest town "made New Hampshire look like a metropolis".

The casting took place in England, as Eggers wanted authentic accents to represent a family newly arrived in colonial Plymouth.

Filming
To give the film an authentic look, Eggers shot only "with natural light and indoors, the only lighting was candles". He also chose to stylize the film's title as "The VVitch" (with two "V"s instead of a "W") in the title sequence and on posters, stating that he found this spelling in a Jacobean-era pamphlet on witchcraft, among other period-texts.

In December 2013, costume designer Linda Muir joined the crew, and consulted 35 books in the Clothes of the Common People in Elizabethan and Early Stuart England series to plan the costumes, which were made with wool, linen, and hemp. She also lobbied for a larger costume budget.

A troupe of Butoh dancers played the coven of witches at the end of the film, creating their own choreography.

Music
Mark Korven wrote the film's score, which aimed to be "tense and dissonant" while focusing on minimalism. Eggers vetoed the use of any electronic instruments and "didn't want any traditional harmony or melody in the score"; so Korven chose to create music with atypical instruments, including the nyckelharpa and waterphone. He knew the director liked to retain a degree of creative control, so he relied on loose play centered on improvisation "so that [Eggers] could move notes around whenever he wanted".

Themes
According to analysts, the film's impact is delivered not through scares, but by the effect of ambience and scenography. This is stylistically represented by the film's use of expressionist lighting, the use of different kinds of camera to draw thematic limits, the editing employed to hide horror from the main sight, and the soundtrack's sonic dissonance accompanying instrumental scenes. Samuel's physically impossible disappearance at the beginning of the film introduces the viewer to the film's atmosphere.

The film's plot orbits around a psychological conflict, using a repressive, patriarchal portrayal of Puritan society and the dark, murderous liberation of the witches. The main female character, Thomasin, harbors worldly desires that differ from those of her conventionally Christian family, yearning for independence, sexuality, acceptance, and power. While her father and the Christian God fail to fulfill her needs, Satan speaks personally to her, offering earthly satisfaction. Therefore, with the demise of her family and the rejection of the Puritan society, Thomasin joins Satan and the witches, her only alternative, in order to find her long desired control over her own life. Her nudity in the last scene reflects her act of casting off the bonds of her previous society.

The difference between both options, nevertheless, is rendered blurred by an evocation of equal religious extremism. This is first felt in the architecture of the family's own home, which ironically resembles an archetypal witch's cottage itself, hinting at the gradual reveal that evil is already installed in them. On the opposite side, Satan's temptation of Thomasin also acquires traits of ideological grooming, slowly alienating her from her family. At the end, despite her newfound cause and ecstatic laugh at the coven, Thomasin has not escaped her previous religiosity, but merely changed its direction, turning to murder in exchange for freedom.

The symbolic conflict between civilization and nature is also present in all the aspects of the film. The family lives next to a dark forest, a place tied to witchcraft in their culture, which underlines the conflict between their civilized, patriarchal religion and the Gothic, wild natural world that surrounds them. The forest, as well as the state of nudity, are associated with monstrosity, with the untamed wilderness where forbidden liberation and sexuality emerge. Accordingly, Caleb returns nude after being seduced by the witch, the witches themselves perform their acts while naked, and Thomasin eventually adopts this code upon joining them. At the end of the film, nature triumphs over its adversary, with the Pan-like Black Phillip goring the axe-wielding William in a metaphor for man being consumed by the wild.

Release
The film had its world premiere on January 27, 2015, at the 2015 Sundance Film Festival. It was screened on September 18, 2015, in the Special Presentations section of the 2015 Toronto International Film Festival.

A24 and DirecTV Cinema acquired the film's distribution rights. As it received very positive reactions in advance screenings, the studios decided to give the film a wide theatrical release in the United States, which occurred on February 19, 2016.

The film was released on Blu-ray and digital HD in the United States on May 17, 2016 by Lionsgate Home Entertainment. Special features on the discs include outtakes, an audio commentary by Eggers, the making-of documentary short The Witch: A Primal Folktale, and a 30-minute question-and-answer session featuring Eggers, Taylor-Joy, and historians Richard Trask and Brunonia Barry, which was filmed in Salem, Massachusetts, after a screening of the film. A 4K Ultra HD Blu-ray of the film was released on April 23, 2019.

Reception

Box office
The Witch grossed $25.1 million in the United States and Canada and $15.3 million in other territories, for a worldwide total theatrical gross of $40.4 million.

In the United States and Canada, the film was released alongside Risen and Race, and was projected to gross $5–7 million from 2,046 theaters in its opening weekend. It made $3.3 million on its first day, and $8.8 million in its opening weekend, finishing fourth at the box office behind Deadpool ($56.5 million), Kung Fu Panda 3 ($12.5 million), and Risen ($11.8 million).

Critical response
On review aggregator website Rotten Tomatoes, the film has an approval rating of 90% based on 335 reviews, with an average score of 7.8/10; the website's "critics consensus" reads: "As thought-provoking as it is visually compelling, The Witch delivers a deeply unsettling exercise in slow-building horror that suggests great things for debuting writer-director Robert Eggers." On Metacritic it has a weighted average score of 83 out of 100 based on 46 critics, indicating "universal acclaim". Audiences polled by CinemaScore gave the film an average grade of "C−" on an A+ to F scale, while PostTrak reported filmgoers gave it a 55% overall positive score and a 41% "definite recommend".

Writing in Variety, Justin Chang commented that "A fiercely committed ensemble and an exquisite sense of historical detail conspire to cast a highly atmospheric spell in The Witch, a strikingly achieved tale of a mid-17th-century New England family's steady descent into religious hysteria and madness." Yohana Desta of Mashable stated that The Witch is a "stunningly crafted experience that'll have you seeking out a church as soon as you leave the theater". Peter Travers, in his Rolling Stone review, gave the film 3½ stars, and wrote of the film: "Building his film on the diabolical aftershocks of Puritan repression, Eggers raises The Witch far above the horror herd. He doesn't need cheap tricks. Eggers merely directs us to look inside." Stephanie Zacharek summarized the movie in Time as "a triumph of tone", writing that "Although Eggers is extremely discreet—the things you don't see are more horrifying than those you do—the picture's relentlessness sometimes feels like torment." Gregory Wakeman, writing for CinemaBlend, gave it five out of five stars, writing that "[its] acting, lighting, music, writing, production design, cinematography, editing, and direction all immediately impress. While, at the same time, they combine to create an innately bewitching tale that keeps you on tenterhooks all the way up until its grandiose but enthralling finale." Ann Hornaday wrote in The Washington Post that the film joins the ranks of horror films such as The Exorcist, The Omen, and Rosemary's Baby, saying that The Witch "comports itself less like an imitator of those classics than their progenitor", which is "a tribute to a filmmaker who, despite his newcomer status, seems to have arrived in the full throes of maturity, in full control of his prodigious powers." Independent filmmaker Jay Bauman of RedLetterMedia named it his favorite film of 2016, enthusiastically stating: "I love it, I think it's a masterpiece... It's a first-time filmmaker which is shocking to me...because it feels like it's made by someone who's been making movies for decades who's a master of their craft".

However, some critics, as well as audiences, were less pleased with the film. Ethan Sacks of the New York Daily News wrote that the film does not suffer from the cinematography, acting, or setting, and early on it "seems that The Witch is tapping a higher metaphor for coming of age...or religious intolerance...or man's uneasy balance with nature...or something. It doesn't take long into the film's hour and a half running time, however, to break that spell." Critics noted that the film received backlash from audiences regarding its themes and slow approach to horror. Lesley Coffin criticized A24, saying it was "a huge mistake" to market The Witch as a terrifying horror film:

HitFix writer Chris Eggertson blamed mainstream Hollywood more generally for the unenthusiastic response of some audiences, saying that The Witch "got under [his] skin profoundly, but it did not have the moment-to-moment, audience-pleasing shocks that moviegoers have become accustomed to thanks to movies like Sinister and The Purge and Paranormal Activity and every other Blumhouse and Platinum Dunes title in the canon."

Horror authors Stephen King and Brian Keene both reacted positively to the film. King tweeted significant praise for the film, writing: "The Witch scared the hell out of me. And it's a real movie, tense and thought-provoking as well as visceral." On social media, Keene stated: "The Witch is a gorgeous, thoughtful, scary horror film that 90% of the people in the theater with you will be too stupid to understand."

Religious
Julia Alexander of Polygon wrote that The Witch "asks people to try and understand what life would have been like for a family of devout Christians living in solitude, terrified of what may happen if they go against the word of God". In The Atlantic, Alissa Wilkinson stated that many films featured at the 2015 Sundance Film Festival—The Witch, along with Last Days in the Desert, Don Verdean, and I Am Michael—reveal a "resurgence of interest in the religious", and described The Witch as "a chilling circa-1600 story of the devil taking over a devout, Scripture-quoting family". Eve Tushnet commented in an article in TAC, which was also published in First Things, that The Witchs view of witchcraft is "not revisionist" and further said the film is "pervaded by the fear of God. There are occasional references to His mercy but only as something to beg for, not something to trust in".

A review by Adam R. Holz in Plugged In, a publication of the conservative Christian organisation Focus on the Family, heavily criticised the film, stating that:

Josh Larsen of Think Christian, however, offered a different Christian explanation of the conclusion of the film, writing: "When it comes to encountering evil, the family in the film veers wildly back and forth between 'triumphalism' and 'defeatism,' two theological extremes", and "in refusing to allow for grace, they become easy pickings for the witch."

Emily VanDerWerff of Vox wrote:

Accolades

See also 
 Witch trials in the early modern period

References

External links

 
 
 
 

2015 films
2015 directorial debut films
2015 horror films
2015 independent films
2010s American films
2010s Canadian films
2010s British films
2010s historical horror films
2010s supernatural horror films
A24 (company) films
Universal Pictures films
American dark fantasy films
American historical horror films
American supernatural horror films
Canadian historical films
Canadian supernatural horror films
British historical films
British supernatural horror films
Brazilian historical films
Brazilian horror films
Demons in film
The Devil in film
English-language Canadian films
English-language Brazilian films
Films about child abduction
Films about dysfunctional families
Films about Satanism
Films about shapeshifting
Films about witchcraft
Films directed by Robert Eggers
Films scored by Mark Korven
Films set on farms
Films set in forests
Films set in the 1630s
Films set in Massachusetts
Films set in New England
Films set in the Thirteen Colonies
Films shot in Ontario
Folk horror films
Matricide in fiction
Period horror films